Newport West railway station is a proposed station to serve the western suburbs of the city of Newport, Wales.

History 
The Newport City Council unitary development plan sets aside an area in Coedkernew adjacent to the Great Western Main Line for the station. As of May 2008 three parcels of land have been acquired by the urban regeneration company Newport Unlimited at the site of the station. The Network Rail Route Utilisation Strategy published in November 2008 confirms the SEWTA aspiration for a station in Coedkernew.

Recent developments 

The land around the site has been safeguarded by Newport City Council for "the Welsh Governments proposed Coedkernew Rail Station and strategic park-and-ride currently under consideration" but has in recent years been neglected in favour of station reopenings in the Cardiff area.

However following the decision by First Minister Mark Drakeford in 2019 to reject the M4 relief road proposal, up to £1.4bn is available through the Welsh Government's borrowing facility for improving infrastructure in and around the south east Wales M4. Reopenings in Newport have as a result been again debated.

See also

 Railway stations in Newport
 South Wales Metro
 Transport for Wales
 Proposed railway stations in Wales

References

Railway stations in Newport, Wales
Proposed railway stations in Wales